Gora is a rural locality (a village) in Vasilyevskoye Rural Settlement, Vashkinsky District, Vologda Oblast, Russia. The population was 2 as of 2002.

Geography 
The distance to Lipin Bor is 11 km, to Vasilyevskaya is 8 km. Levinskaya is the nearest rural locality.

References 

Rural localities in Vashkinsky District